In mathematics, a piecewise-defined function (also called a piecewise function, a hybrid function, or definition by cases) is a function defined by multiple sub-functions, where each sub-function applies to a different interval in the domain. Piecewise definition is actually a way of expressing the function, rather than a characteristic of the function itself.

A distinct, but related notion is that of a property holding piecewise for a function, used when the domain can be divided into intervals on which the property holds. Unlike for the notion above, this is actually a property of the function itself. A piecewise linear function (which happens to be also continuous) is depicted as an example.

Notation and interpretation 

Piecewise functions can be defined using the common functional notation, where the body of the function is an array of functions and associated subdomains. These subdomains together must cover the whole domain; often it is also required that they are pairwise disjoint, i.e. form a partition of the domain. In order for the overall function to be called "piecewise", the subdomains are usually required to be intervals (some may be degenerated intervals, i.e. single points or unbounded intervals). For bounded intervals, the number of subdomains is required to be finite, for unbounded intervals it is often only required to be locally finite. For example, consider the piecewise definition of the absolute value function:

For all values of  less than zero, the first function is used, which negates the sign of the input value, making negative numbers positive.  For all values of  greater than or equal to zero, the second function  is used, which evaluates trivially to the input value itself.

The following table documents the absolute value function at certain values of :

Here, notice that in order to evaluate a piecewise function at a given input value, the appropriate subdomain needs to be chosen in order to select the correct function—and produce the correct output value.

Continuity and differentiability of piecewise functions 

A piecewise function is continuous on a given interval in its domain if the following conditions are met:
 its constituent functions are continuous on the corresponding intervals (subdomains),
 there is no discontinuity at each endpoint of the subdomains within that interval.

The filled circle indicates that the value of the right function piece is used in this position.

For a piecewise function to be differentiable on a given interval in its domain, the following conditions have to fulfilled in addition to those for continuity above:
 its constituent functions are differentiable on the corresponding open intervals,
 the one-sided derivatives exist at all intervals endpoints,
 at the points where two subintervals touch, the corresponding one-sided derivatives of the two neighboring subintervals coincide.

Applications 

In applied mathematical analysis, piecewise functions have been found to be consistent with many models of the human visual system, where images are perceived at a first stage as consisting of smooth regions separated by edges.
In particular, shearlets have been used as a representation system to provide sparse approximations of this model class in 2D and 3D.

Common examples 

 Piecewise linear function, a piecewise function composed of line segments
 Step function, a piecewise function composed of constant functions
 Boxcar function,
 Heaviside step function
 Sign function
 Absolute value
 Triangular function
 Broken power law, a piecewise function composed of power laws
 Spline, a piecewise function composed of polynomial functions, possessing a high degree of smoothness at the places where the polynomial pieces connect
 B-spline
 PDIFF
  and some other common Bump functions. These are infinitely differentiable, but analyticity holds only piecewise.
 Continuous functions in the reals need not be bounded or uniformly continuous, but are always piecewise bounded and piecewise uniformly continuous.

See also 

 Piecewise linear continuation

References

Functions and mappings